Te Voy a Conquistar may refer to:

 "Te Voy a Conquistar", a song by Intocable also included on their 2003 compilation album La Historia
 "Te Voy a Conquistar", a 2008 song by Los Favoritos from Tu Favorito
 "Te Voy a Conquistar", a song by Ricky Martin from his 1991 album of the same name
 Te Voy a Conquistar, a 2022 album and song by Raymix